Stade Montois is a French rugby union team that currently is playing in Pro D2, the second level of the country's professional league system.

They were founded in 1908 and play in yellow and black. They are based in Mont-de-Marsan, the capital of the Landes département, in Nouvelle-Aquitaine, and play at the Stade Guy Boniface.

History
Stade Montois is a multi-sports club (28 sections) but its rugby team has always been its flagship. After winning a few regional titles between the two world wars, it reached the top of French club rugby four times in 15 years. It lost its first three French championship finals to Castres Olympique in 1949 (3-14, in a replay, after the original final had ended in a 3-3 draw), to FC Lourdes in 1953 (16-21), and to Racing Club de France in 1959 (3-8). Their finest hour came in 1963 in an all Landes-final against US Dax, won by the Yellow and Black 9-6. They had finally won one, whereas their Dax neighbours would lose all five finals they would play in.

It finished in the bottom table in the first-tier Top 14 in the 2008–09 season. They had just been promoted to the Top 14 after winning the Pro D2 promotion playoffs. They remained in Pro D2 for three seasons before successfully navigating the 2012 promotion playoffs.

Stade Montois' players include the Boniface brothers (André and Guy, who died in a car accident on 1 January 1968), Thomas Castaignède, Christian Darrouy, Benoît Dauga, Laurent Rodriguez. Former Leicester Tigers and Fiji scrum-half wizard Waisale Serevi also played for them as well as other notable Fijians such as Viliame Satala and Vilimoni Delasau.

Honours
 French championship::
 Champions: 1963
 Runners-up: 1949, 1953, 1959
 Challenge Yves du Manoir/Coupe de France:
 Champions: 1960, 1961, 1962
 Runners-up: 1958, 1966
 Rugby Pro D2:
 Champions: 2002
 Promotion playoff winners: 2008, 2012
 Second Division (Groupe B):
 Champions: 1998

Finals results

French championship

Current standings

Current squad

The squad for the 2022–23 season is:

Espoirs squad

Notable former players

 Carlos Muzzio
 Lucio Sordoni
 Ben Coutts
 Jens Torfs
 Josh Jackson
 Luke Tait
 Martin Jágr
 Laurence Pearce
 James Voss
 Adriu Delai
 Vilimoni Delasau
 Vereniki Goneva
 Wame Lewaravu
 Timoci Matanavou
 William Ryder
 Waisale Serevi
 Viliame Satala
 Cédric Beal
 Alexandre Bécognée
 André Boniface
 Guy Boniface
 Romain Cabannes
 André Carrère
 Stéphane Castaignède
 Thomas Castaignède
 Fernand Cazenave
 Damien Cler
 Pierre Corréia
 Marc Dal Maso
 Jean Darrieussecq
 Christian Darrouy
 Benoît Dauga
 Walter Desmaison
 Fabien Devecchi
 Pierre Lacroix
 Grégory Le Corvec
 Laurent Magnaval
 Rémy Martin
 Florent Massip
 Jean-Marc Mazzonetto
 Eric Melville
 Alexandre Menini
 Arnaud Mignardi
 Adrien Oléon
 Sébastien Ormaechea
 Clément Otazo
 Laurent Rodriguez
 Olivier Sourgens
 Jocelino Suta
 Rémi Talès
 Willy Taofifénua
 Lucas Tauzin
 Mikaele Tuugahala
 Beka Gorgadze
 Tamaz Mchedlidze
 Irakli Machkhaneli
 Gilles Pagnon
 Walter Cristofoletto
 Andrea De Marchi
 Laurent Travini
 Raoul Larson
 António Aguilar
 André da Silva
 Trevor Leota
 Sébastien Loubsens
 Tevita Mailau
 Ephraim Taukafa

See also
 List of rugby union clubs in France
 Rugby union in France

References

External links
  Stade Montois Official website
  Blog "Marine et Jaune"

MontdeMarsan
Rugby clubs established in 1908
Mont-de-Marsan
1908 establishments in France
Sport in Landes (department)